The 1977 World Series of Poker (WSOP) was a series of poker tournaments held at Binion's Horseshoe.

Preliminary events

Main Event
There were 34 entrants to the main event. Each paid $10,000 to enter the winner-take-all tournament.

Final table

Notes 

World Series of Poker
World Series of Poker